This page is about the mountain in the Boundary Country near Greenwood, British Columbia.  For the ghost town and former mine near Princeton see Copper Mountain, British Columbia

Copper Mountain is a mountain in British Columbia, north of Greenwood and north-west of Grand Forks.

References

Boundary Country
One-thousanders of British Columbia
Monashee Mountains
Similkameen Division Yale Land District